Overkill is the twenty-fourth album by the Norwegian electronic dance music producer Aleksander Vinter, and his sixth using the alias "Savant". It was released on 7 March 2013. It was released for free, and consists of previously released singles compiled into this album.

The track "Feel Me" is replaced by another track called "Shark" in all online music stores apart from Bandcamp.

Since its original release, Overkill has become a paid album on all online music stores, including Bandcamp. With the exceptions of "Big Ben", "Requiem of Dreams", "Love" and "Feel Me", the album was posted to Vinter's SoundCloud page and each track could be downloaded for free. However, on 5 September 2015, Vinter announced on his Facebook fan page that SoundCloud no longer allows free downloads from his account, claiming that Vinter had uploaded too many tracks that infringed copyrights. Vinter stated that this is probably because of the large number of remixes posted from his account on the site.

Track listing
"Big Ben" - 1:22
"Requiem of Dreams" - 5:38
"Overkill" - 4:56
"Storm the Gates" - 3:11
"Aces Sleeved" - 9:00
"Technodrome" - 3:44
"Vario 64" - 3:30
"Love" (produced under Vinter in Hollywood) - 5:15
"Wade In The Water" - 5:36
"Wildstyle" - 3:54
"Feel Me" - 2:31

Bonus track - "Shark" - 4:30

References

2013 albums
Savant (musician) albums